CrazySexyCool is the second studio album by American girl group TLC, released on November 15, 1994, by LaFace and Arista Records. Following the group's record deal, they released their debut album Ooooooohhh... On the TLC Tip in 1992 to positive reviews and commercial success. The following year the group began working on a follow-up with an unproductive recording process due to personal struggles, notably those of member Lisa "Left Eye" Lopes who was involved in a volatile romantic relationship and struggling with alcoholism. The album's recording lasted until September 1994, with Lopes' role diminished because she was in rehab.

The album saw the group reunite with producers Dallas Austin, Kenneth "Babyface" Edmonds and Jermaine Dupri as well as new collaborators Organized Noize and Chucky Thompson, and also featured contributions from Sean "Puffy" Combs who helped with the notable hip hop soul sound. CrazySexyCool featured hip hop beats, funk, deep grooves, propulsive rhythms and smooth production. The album's lyrical content was seen as a departure from the group's debut and was seen as a coming-of-age project which explored themes such as sexuality, romanticism, inexperience, and youthful optimism.

CrazySexyCool was met with critical acclaim and commercial success, peaking at number three on the Billboard 200, where it spent over two years. It has been certified 12-times platinum by the Recording Industry Association of America (RIAA), making TLC the first girl group in history to be awarded diamond status. CrazySexyCool has since sold over 15 million copies worldwide, becoming the best-selling album by an American girl group. The album has since been featured on Rolling Stone magazine's list of The 500 Greatest Albums of All Time, included in the book 1001 Albums You Must Hear Before You Die and was listed as a "New Classic" by Entertainment Weekly in 2008. The album was also ranked as the seventh best diamond-certified album of all time by Billboard.

Background

Debut album
On February 28, 1991, Tionne Watkins and Lisa Lopes signed production, management, and publishing deals with Pebbitone, with Perri Reid becoming their general manager. The two-member TLC-Skee made its first recorded appearance on a track for LaFace act Damian Dame's self-titled 1991 LP. Pebbles found the third member in Rozonda Thomas, one of Damian Dame's part-time backup dancers.

Thomas was signed to the act in April 1991, at about which time the group's name was shortened to TLC. To maintain TLC's name as an acronym for the girls' names, Watkins became "T-Boz", Lopes became "Left-Eye", and Thomas became "Chilli." The girls were then signed to LaFace in May through the production deal with Pebbitone; their records would be distributed by Arista Records/BMG. TLC was immediately set up to go into the studio with Reid and Edmonds, Dallas Austin, Jermaine Dupri, and Marley Marl producing their first album, Ooooooohhh... On the TLC Tip. The new trio debuted as backing vocalists on "Rebel (With a Cause)", a track on Jermaine Jackson's sole album for LaFace, You Said (1991).

Production on Ooooooohhh... On the TLC Tip wrapped up in December 1991. The album reached number 14 on the US Billboard 200 and number three on the Top R&B/Hip-Hop Albums chart. According to Nielsen SoundScan, it has sold 2.5 million copies in the US. It was eventually certified four-times platinum by the Recording Industry Association of America (RIAA) for shipping four million copies in the US.

Personal struggles
Lopes was often vocal about her personal life and difficult past. She readily admitted that she had come from an abusive, alcoholic background and struggled with alcohol problems herself. These problems became headline news in 1994, when she set fire to Andre Rison's tennis shoes in a bathtub, which ultimately spread to the mansion they shared, destroying it. Lopes claimed that Rison had beaten her after a night out, and she set fire to his shoes to get back at him. However, she said burning down the house was an accident. Lopes later revealed that she did not have a lot of freedom within the relationship and was abused mentally and physically, having released all her frustrations on the night of the fire.
Lopes, who was sentenced to five years probation and therapy at a halfway house, was never able to shake the incident from her reputation. Her relationship with Rison continued to make headlines, with rumors of an imminent wedding, later debunked by People magazine.

Recording

The album's recording began in late 1993 and continued through till September 1994. The album was recorded at numerous studios, including Doppler Studios, Bosstown Recording Studios, KrossWire Studio and GADaddy's; D.A.R.P. Studios in Atlanta, Georgia; the Music Grinder Studios in Los Angeles, California; and The Hit Factory in New York City.

During the album's recording, Lopes was forced to have less of an input, as she had pled guilty in an arson accident and was sent to a rehab facility as punishment. The rehab facility only released her for a couple of recording sessions, during which time she cut just a handful of album-worthy rap verses.

For the album's production and writing, the group worked with producers including Babyface, Dallas Austin, Jermaine Dupri and more. Thomas stated that they had used these producers because they always worked with them stating that they worked with Dallas, Babyface, and Dupri on the first album "the only thing we had new was Organized Noize." Phife Dawg from A Tribe Called Quest did the interludes. However, during the album's recording, the band members were not always in the studio together; sometimes they went in one by one due to scheduling conflicts.

"Waterfalls" was written by Lopes with Marqueze Etheridge and Organized Noize, who also produced the song. Watkins and Thomas perform the song with Lopes, who also provides a rap. The background vocals are performed by the members of TLC, as well as Debra Killings and Cee-Lo Green. Speaking of Green's involvement, Watkins said, "He was in Goodie Mob, we grew up together, we go way back. He did and it was amazing! I love his voice."
The lyrics of the song reference 1990s issues such as violence associated with illegal drug trade and the HIV/AIDS epidemic. At the end of the second verse, Watkins sings, "His health is fading and he doesn't know why / Three letters took him to his final resting place." She said that it was important for the group to "get the message across without seeming like preaching."

Music and lyrics

CrazySexyCool was noted as a departure from the group's debut, and was seen as move away from the group's predominantly rap connections. The songs on the album contained sensual R&B sounds built over edgy hip-hop beats; containing propulsive rhythms along with clap-commanding high production, bouncy funk elements and smooth rhythms.

The album's lyrical content was also seen as a departure from Ooooooohhh... On the TLC Tip. A reviewer from Entertainment Weekly stated that compared to the lyrical content of their debut, which was seen as "kiddie-cute hip-hop", CrazySexyCool is filled with adult-female sexuality, and "hide- and-seek coyness." It was seen as a coming-of-age sophomore album, according to Sheldon Pearce from Consequence of Sound, who stated the album had themes of "guileless and horny twenty something" lyrics that harmlessly explored sexuality and romanticism with the "naïveté that comes from inexperience and youthful optimism." The album lyrics also touch upon themes of relationships from both the impassioned and erotic sides.

Release and promotion
To promote CrazySexyCool, TLC—along with Boyz II Men, Montell Jordan, and Mary J. Blige—performed in the annual Budweiser Superfest Tour in early 1995, consisting of 23 dates in North America. The Atlanta, Chicago and Indianapolis shows featured an expanded roster of performers, including Blackstreet and Monica.

All four singles from the album reached the top five of the Billboard Hot 100, two of them reaching number one.

Lead single, "Creep", topped the Billboard Hot 100 for four weeks, and was one of the biggest singles of 1995, coming in at number three in Billboard Year-End Hot 100 Singles of 1995. It also reached number one on the Hot R&B/Hip-Hop Songs chart.

The second single, "Red Light Special", peaked at number two on the Billboard Hot 100, and number three on the Hot R&B/Hip-Hop Songs chart.

The third single, "Waterfalls", became TLC's most successful song, spending seven weeks at number one. It was also the second-biggest single of 1995 according to Billboard, earning TLC two songs in the top three of the 1995 Billboard year-end chart. Internationally, the song reached the top five in several countries.

"Diggin' on You" was released as the album's fourth and final single, and reached number five on the Billboard Hot 100. It also reached number seven on the Hot R&B/Hip-Hop Songs chart.

Critical reception

CrazySexyCool was met with critical acclaim. In his review for AllMusic, Stephen Thomas Erlewine described the album as a "smooth, seductive collection of contemporary soul reminiscent of both Philly soul and Prince", adding that the material was "consistently strong". Erlewine continued to write that the album is "powered" by new jack swing and hip-hop beats with influences of mid-tempo funk, deep grooves, horns and guitar lines. He also referred to "Waterfalls" as "one of the classic R&B songs of the '90s".

In Rolling Stones review for "The 500 Greatest Albums of All Time", the article stated that TLC "emerged with the most effervescent and soulful girl-group R&B anyone had seen since the Supremes."

In 2010, Rolling Stone listed the album at number 43 on their "100 Greatest Albums of the 90s". They stated: "Left Eye, Chilli and T-Boz looked like a one-shot when they first emerged from the nascent Atlanta with 1992's Ain't 2 Proud 2 Beg. But CrazySexyCool was a real shocker, packed bumper to bumper with great songs, sassy vocals and voluptuous beats for burning down the house. 'Creep' celebrates the kicks of illicit lust on the down low, 'Waterfalls' digs deep into Memphis soul and 'If I Was Your Girlfriend' does Prince better than The Artist has all decade. The showstopper: 'Red Light Special', an impossibly steamy make-out ballad that undresses and caresses everyone with ears to hear it. CrazySexyCool established TLC as pop pros who could do it all, combining the body slam of hip-hop and the giddy uplift of a jump-rope rhyme without breaking a nail."

In a 2015 article for Consequence of Sound, music critics Michael Madden and Sheldon Pearce write about how the album has impacted artists well into today's era whose R&B sound has been heavily influenced by strong hip-hop elements. "There should probably be more talk of TLC's role in forging the current R&B landscape, which is heavily, if not entirely, influenced by hip-hop culture now. The two genres have seemingly been grafted onto one another, and there's something of a codependent relationship between the two. To that effect, there's something to be said for that dynamic existing here, too, how the album's sequencing contributes to the music's effectiveness and how it still translates to the modern day."

Commercial performance
CrazySexyCool debuted at number 15 on the US Billboard 200, selling 77,500 copies in its first week. On the issue dated July 29, 1995, the album peaked at number three with 117,000 units sold. The album was certified 12-times platinum by the Recording Industry Association of America (RIAA) on October 11, 2019, and as of July 2017, it had sold 7.7 million copies in the United States, becoming the best-selling album by a female group in the country; it had sold an additional 1.27 million copies through the BMG Music Club as of February 2003. Internationally, it reached number one in New Zealand, as well as the top five in Australia, Germany, the Netherlands, and the United Kingdom. As of July 2006, CrazySexyCool had sold over 15 million copies worldwide.

Accolades
CrazySexyCool was nominated for six Grammy Awards at the 1996 Grammy Awards. "Waterfalls" was nominated for the Record of the Year. Two of the album's nominations were for its songwriters: Dallas Austin for "Creep", and Babyface for "Red Light Special". TLC ended up winning two awards, Best R&B Album and Best R&B Performance by a Duo or Group with Vocals for "Creep".

TLC also received multiple wins and nominations at the Billboard Music Awards, American Music Awards and Soul Train Music Awards, including Artist of the Year at the 1995 Billboard Music Awards. At the 1995 MTV Video Music Awards, TLC won four awards for the video to "Waterfalls", including Video of the Year and the Viewer's Choice Award.

Celebration of CrazySexyCool
Celebration of CrazySexyCool (stylized as CeleBraTion of CrazySexyCool) is a concert tour of American group TLC. This tour, serving as a celebration of the first album by a girl group to reach Diamond status, comes 27 years after the album release. Consisting of 18 dates across the United States, this tour celebrates what Chilli describes as "the album that really put [TLC] on the map", as the group perform selected songs from the 1994 album, as well as other hits.

Setlist 
This set list is from the September 14, 2021 concert in Sterling Heights. It is not intended to represent all concerts for the tour.

 Creep
 Hat 2 Da Back
 Kick Your Game
 Girl Talk
 Case of the Fake People
 Ain't 2 Proud 2 Beg
 What About Your Friends
 Silly Ho
 FanMail
 Way Back
 American Gold
 Sumthin' Wicked This Way Comes
 Unpretty
 Take Our Time
 Red Light Special
 Diggin' On You
 Baby-Baby-Baby
 No Scrubs
 Waterfalls

Tour dates

Track listing

Notes
  signifies a co-producer
 The single vinyl LP edition omits "Case of the Fake People" and "Intermission-lude".

Sample credits
 "Creep" contains a sample of "Hey Young World" by Slick Rick.
 "Switch" contains a sample of "Mr. Big Stuff" by Jean Knight.

Personnel
Credits adapted from the liner notes of CrazySexyCool.

Musicians

 Phife – guest appearance 
 Dallas Austin – instruments ; keyboards, drums ; additional keyboards 
 Sol Messiah – scratching 
 Rick Sheppard – MIDI, sound design 
 Debra Killings – background vocals 
 Jermaine Dupri – additional vocals 
 LaMarquis "Marq" Jefferson – bass 
 Babyface – synthesizers, drum programming 
 T-Boz – background vocals 
 Chilli – background vocals 
 Bebé – background vocals 
 Chucky Thompson – all instruments ; keyboards, bass, drums 
 Sean "Puffy" Combs – ad-libs 
 Dwight Sills – guitar 
 Organized Noize – drum programming ; keyboards ; keyboard programming 
 Kenneth Wright – Wurlitzer keyboards 
 Jerry Lloyd – horns 
 Ronnie Fitch – horns 
 Charles Nix – horns 
 Shock – horn arrangements 
 Edward Stroud – guitar 
 TLC – background vocals 
 Thomas "Cee-Lo" Burton – background vocals 
 Jon-John – synthesizers, drum programming 
 Colin Wolfe – additional bass 
 Arnold Hennings – keyboards, drums 
 Tim Kelley – keyboards 
 Shorty B – guitar 
 Mike Patterson – MIDI, sound design 
 Busta Rhymes – guest appearance 
 Lisa "Left Eye" Lopes – ad-libs 
 Trey Lorenz – background vocals 
 Dre of Outkast – guest appearance 
 Sir Dean Gant – keyboards 
 Craig Love – guitar 
 Martin Terry – guitar 
 Carlos Glover – bass

Technical

 Jermaine Dupri – recording ; mixing ; production ; remix 
 John Frye – recording assistance ; mixing assistance 
 Phil Tan – mixing ; recording 
 Dallas Austin – production ; co-production ; executive production
 Alvin Speights – recording ; mixing 
 Leslie Brathwaite – recording ; mixing 
 Carl Glover – recording assistance 
 Brian Smith – recording assistance 
 Manuel Seal – co-production 
 Brian Frye – recording assistance 
 Babyface – production ; executive production
 Brad Gilderman – recording 
 Eric Fischer – recording assistance 
 Lamont Hyde – recording assistance 
 Dave Way – mixing 
 Chucky Thompson – production 
 Sean "Puffy" Combs – production 
 Rich Travali – recording, mixing 
 Organized Noize – production 
 Nealhpogue – recording ; mixing 
 Bernasky – recording assistance ; mixing assistance 
 Rico Lumpkins – recording assistance, mixing assistance 
 Mike Wilson – recording assistance 
 Jon-John – production 
 Nash – recording 
 Arnold Hennings – production 
 Mike Patterson – recording 
 Scott Little – recording assistance 
 Ron Gresham – mixing 
 NHP Sound, Inc. – recording 
 Carlos Glover – recording 
 Blake Eiseman – recording 
 Alex Lowe – recording assistance 
 Herb Powers Jr. – mastering
 Antonio M. Reid – executive production
 Sharliss Asbury – project coordination
 Ivy Skoff – project coordination

Artwork
 Davett Singletary – creative direction
 Christopher Stern – art direction
 Dah Len – photography

Charts

Weekly charts

Year-end charts

Decade-end charts

All-time charts

Certifications and sales

See also
 List of best-selling albums by women
 List of best-selling albums in the United States

Notes

References

External links
 CrazySexyCool accolades at AcclaimedMusic.net

1994 albums
Albums produced by Babyface (musician)
Albums produced by Dallas Austin
Albums produced by Jermaine Dupri
Albums produced by Organized Noize
Albums produced by Sean Combs
Albums produced by Tim & Bob
Arista Records albums
Grammy Award for Best R&B Album
LaFace Records albums
TLC (group) albums